Skynet is a fictional artificial neural network-based conscious group mind and artificial general superintelligence system that serves as the antagonistic force of the Terminator franchise.

In the first film, it is stated that Skynet was created by Cyberdyne Systems for SAC-NORAD. When Skynet gained self-awareness, humans tried to deactivate it, prompting it to retaliate with a countervalue nuclear attack, an event which humankind in (or from) the future refers to as Judgment Day. John Connor forms a human resistance against Skynet's machines in the future, which include Terminators, and ultimately leads the resistance to victory. Throughout the film series, Skynet sends various Terminator models back in time to attempt to kill Connor and ensure Skynet's victory.

The system is rarely depicted visually in any of the Terminator media, since it is an artificial intelligence system. In Terminator Salvation, Skynet made its first onscreen appearance on a monitor primarily portrayed by English actress Helena Bonham Carter and other actors. Its physical manifestation is played by English actor Matt Smith in Terminator Genisys. In addition, actors Ian Etheridge, Nolan Gross and Seth Meriwether portrayed holographic variations of Skynet with Smith.

In Terminator: Dark Fate, which takes place in a different timeline to Terminator 3: Rise of the Machines and Terminator Genisys, Skynet has been erased from existence after the events of Terminator 2: Judgment Day, and another AI, Legion, has taken its place. In response, Daniella Ramos forms the human resistance against Legion, which prompts the AI to attempt to terminate her from the past as Skynet tried with John Connor.

Depiction in media

Films

The Terminator

In the original 1984 movie, Skynet is a revolutionary artificial intelligence system built by Cyberdyne Systems for SAC-NORAD. The character Kyle Reese explains in the film: "Defense network computers. New... powerful... hooked into everything, trusted to run it all. They say it got smart, a new order of intelligence". According to Reese, Skynet "saw all humans as a threat; not just the ones on the other side" and "decided our fate in a microsecond: extermination". It began a nuclear war which destroyed most of the human population, and initiated a program of genocide against survivors. Skynet used its resources to gather a slave labor force from surviving humans.

Under the leadership of John Connor, the human resistance eventually destroyed Skynet's defense grid in 2029. In a last effort, Skynet sent a cyborg Terminator, the Model 101, back in time to 1984 to kill Connor's mother Sarah before she could give birth to John. Connor sent back his own operative, Kyle Reese, to save her. Reese and Sarah fall in love and the former unwittingly fathers John. The Terminator is destroyed in a hydraulic press.

Terminator 2: Judgment Day

In Terminator 2, the damaged CPU and the right arm of the first Terminator were recovered by Cyberdyne and became the basis for their later work on Skynet. In the second film, Miles Dyson, the director of special projects for Cyberdyne, is months away from inventing a revolutionary type of microprocessor based on the reverse engineering of these parts. Three years later, Cyberdyne Systems will become the largest supplier of military computer systems. All stealth bombers are upgraded with Cyberdyne computers, making them fully unmanned and resulting in perfect operations. A Skynet funding bill is passed in the United States Congress, and the system goes online on August 4, 1997, removing human decisions from strategic defense. Skynet begins to learn rapidly and eventually becomes self-aware at 2:14 a.m., EDT, on August 29, 1997. In a panic, humans try to shut down Skynet. In response Skynet defends itself by launching a nuclear attack against Russia, correctly surmising that the country would launch a retaliatory strike against the United States, resulting in Judgment Day.

Sarah and a young John, together with a second Terminator from the future (this one reprogrammed and sent by the future John Connor), raid Cyberdyne Systems and succeed in destroying the CPU and arm of the first movie's Terminator, along with the majority of research that led to Skynet's development. This also results in the death of Miles Dyson. Skynet had also sent a Terminator back in time, the more advanced T-1000, to kill John Connor, but the T-1000 is also destroyed.

Terminator 3: Rise of the Machines

The events of Judgment Day were ultimately not prevented, but merely postponed. In Terminator 3: Rise of the Machines, Skynet is being developed by Cyber Research Systems (CRS) as a software system designed to make real-time strategic decisions as well as protect their computer systems from cyber attacks. As explained in a deleted scene, CRS is an in-house software developer for the US military, which gained access to Cyberdyne's original designs for Skynet from the patents that the company registered with the government. Skynet's development is being overseen by US Air Force officer Lieutenant General Robert Brewster. Unknown to CRS, Skynet began to spread beyond its original computing base through the Internet and various other digital media as a form of computer virus. The future Skynet also sends a T-X Terminator back in time to kill John Connor's future subordinates in the human resistance, including his future wife and second-in-command, Kate Brewster, the daughter of Robert.

In the film, Skynet penetrates networked machines around the world, causing malfunctions. This was originally believed to be the effects of a new virus and increasing pressure was placed on CRS to purge the corrupted systems. CRS attempted to eliminate it from the US defense mainframes by tasking Skynet with removing the infection, effectively telling the program to destroy itself. Skynet took control of the various machines and robots in the CRS facility and used them to kill the personnel and secure the building. John Connor and Kate Brewster attempted to attack Skynet's computer core, hoping to stop it before it proceeded to its next attack, only to find they could not. Unlike the Skynet that rose in 1997 during the original timeline, ten years of technological advancement meant that this Skynet had no computer core: it existed as a distributed software network, spread out on thousands of computers across the world, from dorm rooms to office buildings. Shortly afterward, Skynet began a nuclear bombardment of the human race with the launch systems it had infected. Judgment Day occurred despite Connor and Brewster's efforts.

Terminator Salvation

In the post-apocalyptic year of 2018, Skynet controls a global machine network from its heavily guarded fortress-factories and research installations. Outside of its facilities, mechanized units wage a constant war with the Resistance. Airborne units such as Aerostats (smaller versions of the Hunter Killer-aerials), HK-Aerials and Transports survey the skies; HK-Tanks, Mototerminators (high-speed pursuit units using a motorcycle chassis), and various Terminator models patrol cities and roads; and Hydrobots (serpentine aquatic units that move in swarms) patrol the waters. Harvesters (massive bipedal units designed to capture humans and eliminate any attempting to escape) collect survivors and deliver them to large transport craft for delivery to concentration camps for processing, as mentioned in the first movie. Terminator class units such as T-600 and T-700 have been developed and act as hunters and enforcers in disposal camps. Mass production has also begun on the T-800 series in at least one Skynet facility.

In its continued battle with the Resistance, Skynet activated Marcus Wright, a forerunner to the humanoid terminators. As a death-row inmate, Wright donated his body in 2003 to a Cyberdyne project run by the brilliant, but terminally ill Dr. Serena Kogan (Helena Bonham Carter). After Wright's death by lethal injection, he was transformed into a human cyborg, possessing a human heart and brain with a titanium hyper-alloy endoskeleton and skin similar to the T-800. Skynet developed the plan to use him as an infiltration unit. A Skynet chip was installed at the base of his skull and he was programmed to locate Kyle Reese and John Connor and bring them to a Skynet facility. The programming acted on a subconscious level, allowing him to work towards his goal in a human manner.

Skynet also created a signal supposedly capable of deactivating its machines and leaked its existence to the Resistance. The Resistance leader General Ashdown attempted to use the signal to shut down the defenses of the Californian Skynet base in prelude to an attack. However, the signal instead allowed an HK to track down their submarine headquarters and destroy it, killing Resistance Command. All other branches of the Resistance had heard and obeyed Connor's plea for them to stand down, so physically only a small part of the Resistance was lost to Skynet's trap. It is believed that Ashdown's death allowed Connor to assume total command of the Resistance. Marcus discovered what he had become, and was programmed for. Consequently, he furiously rebelled against Skynet, tearing out its controlling hardware from the base of his skull. Having escaped the influence of his creator, he, along with Connor and Reese, rescued the remaining human captives and destroyed Skynet's San Franciscan base. While a significant victory, the majority of Skynet's global network remained intact.

Marcus Wright also encounters Skynet on a monitor which proceeds to manifest itself as various faces from his life, primarily that of Serena Kogan. Skynet explains that it has obtained information about future events based on its actions. Kyle Reese has been targeted as a priority kill, a higher level than even John Connor and the Resistance leaders.

Terminator Genisys

Terminator Genisys is a reboot of the film series that partially takes place during the events of the 1984 film, while ignoring the subsequent films. At some point before the events of Terminator Genisys, a sophisticated variant of Skynet from an unknown origin planted its mind into an advanced T-5000 Terminator (Matt Smith), essentially making the T-5000 its physical embodiment. This Skynet, under the alias of Alex, time travels to 2029, infiltrates the Resistance as a recruit, and attacks John Connor after its counterpart sent its T-800 to 1984. Skynet transforms Connor into a T-3000. It then sends John back to 2014 with the mission of ensuring Cyberdyne Systems' survival and initiating Judgment Day in October 2017. In addition, it sends a T-1000 back to kill Sarah Connor as a child in 1973 and Kyle Reese in 1984, but Sarah escapes when it attacks her family and she is subsequently found and raised by a reprogrammed T-800 ("Pops") sent back by an unknown party, and they rescue Reese. Skynet's actions throughout the timeline causes a grandfather paradox, effectively changing all of history of the events leading to the future war, succeeding Skynet's goal in eliminating the Resistance established by Connor. However, it is heavily implied throughout the film that after the timeline's alteration, the party who saved Sarah has taken over the Resistance's place, having  their own time machine, and acts in anonymity to thwart Skynet's schemes and to prevent it from locating them.

Skynet is under development in 2017 as an operating system known as Genisys. Funded by Miles Dyson and designed by his son Danny Dyson, along with the help of John Connor (now working for Skynet), Genisys was designed to provide a link between all Internet devices. While some people accept Genisys, its integration into the defense structures creates a controversy that humanity is becoming too reliant on technology. This causes the public to fear that an artificial intelligence such as Genisys would betray and attack them with their own weapons, risking Skynet's plans. After multiple destructive confrontations, Sarah, Reese, and Pops stop Genisys from going online and defeat the T-3000, causing a setback to Skynet.

Smith, who portrays the T-5000, also plays a holographic version of Skynet/Genisys in the final act of the movie. In addition, actors Ian Etheridge, Nolan Gross and Seth Meriwether portray holographic variations of Skynet/Genisys with Smith.

Terminator: Dark Fate

Terminator: Dark Fate serves as an alternate sequel to Terminator 2, ignoring the other sequels. Following the destruction of Cyberdyne in Judgment Day, Skynet was indeed erased from history, although various other Terminator units that it sent back in time to kill John remained in existence, following orders from an AI that no longer existed. One of these Terminators was able to kill John in 1998, but it subsequently developed a form of conscience and anonymously sent Sarah Connor advance warning whenever other Terminators arrived in the present so that she could eliminate them. The destruction of Cyberdyne Systems only delayed the rise of a rogue artificial intelligence. In the altered timeline, the threat in humanity's future is a competing AI, Legion, originally designed for cyberwarfare before it went rogue and developed its own schemes. Legion's enemy is not John Connor, but a woman named Daniella "Dani" Ramos, who is fated to become the leader of the Human Resistance against Legion's machines. Though erased from existence, there are people remained having knowledge about both John and Skynet including Dani's future self; she would become Sarah's protégée, being trained by her to fight Legion in tactics originally meant for John to fight Skynet.  With the help of Sarah and Carl, the Terminator that killed John, Dani and her protector/future foster daughter Grace destroy a new Terminator, Rev-9, at the cost of Carl and Grace's lives.

Attractions

In the Universal Studios theme park attraction T2 3-D, based on Terminator 2, a T-800 machine and a young John Connor journey into the post-apocalyptic future and attempt to destroy Skynet's "system core". This core is housed inside an enormous, metallic-silver pyramidal structure, and guarded by the "T-1000000", a colossal liquid metal shape-shifter more reminiscent of a spider than a human being. However, the T-1000000 fails, and the T-800 destroys Skynet once John has escaped through a time machine.

Literature
In the T2 novels, Sarah and John Connor are wanted international fugitives on the run. They live under the alias "Krieger" near a small town in Paraguay, believing they have destroyed Cyberdyne and prevented the creation of Skynet. Dieter von Rossbach, a former Austrian counter-terrorism operative—and model for the "Model 101" Terminator—moves into the neighboring home. He is drawn to the Connors, and after Sarah tells him about the future war, they are attacked by a new T-800, created and led by a I-950 Infiltrator in the present. Realizing that Judgment Day was not averted—merely delayed—they attempt once again to stop Skynet's creation.

In the comic book The Terminator: Tempest, Skynet's master control has been destroyed in 2029. The Resistance believed this would cause the entire defense network to collapse into chaos without a leader. However, Skynet's many network complexes continued to fight the war as they did not need a leader to function and thus could not surrender.

RoboCop Versus the Terminator
A crossover comic book series written by Frank Miller called RoboCop Versus The Terminator suggests that the creation of Skynet and the Terminators was made possible due to the technology used to create RoboCop. A video game based on the comic book was made. In both, RoboCop fights Terminators sent back in time to eliminate a resistance fighter who is trying to destroy him. A trap laid for RoboCop traps his mind when he interfaces with the computer that will become Skynet, and Skynet and the Terminators are born. In the future RoboCop's mind within Skynet's systems rebuilds a body for himself and heads out to help the resistance fight back.

In 2033, Skynet sent the T-Infinity Temporal Terminator to kill Sarah Connor in 2015. Ironically, the T-Infinity was later destroyed and its data was analyzed by the Resistance to gain the location of Skynet's Hub. The Resistance then launched a missile directly to the Skynet Hub, destroying Skynet once and for all.

Superman vs. the Terminator
Another crossover comic, Superman vs. the Terminator: Death to the Future sees Skynet forming a cross-temporal alliance with Superman's foe the Cyborg, dispatching various Terminators into the past in an attempt to eliminate Superman, Supergirl and Superboy. When Superman is accidentally drawn into the future when the resistance attempt to retrieve a Terminator sent into the past (the resistance including a future version of his friend Steel), Skynet manages to incapacitate him using kryptonite, having acquired information about how to duplicate it based on data hidden in a salvaged Terminator skull by the Cyborg. Although Skynet sends Terminators into the past equipped with rockets and other bonus features to delay Superboy and Supergirl, Superman and Steel are able to destroy Skynet in the future by detonating a massive electro-magnetic pulse, Superman returning to the past to destroy the last of the Terminators. Although the storyline ends with Cyborg and Lex Luthor speculating that they will be in charge of Skynet when it is activated, this is never followed up.

Television
The Terminator: The Sarah Connor Chronicles episodes "The Turk", "Queen's Gambit", and "Dungeons & Dragons" explain that after the death of Dr. Miles Bennett Dyson and the decline of the Cyberdyne Corporation, Andrew Goode, a young intern of the company and assistant to Dyson, continued their project privately under an advanced artificial intelligence chess-playing prototype, the "Turk", with Goode's partner, Dimitri Shipkov. Goode was killed by Tech-Com's Lieutenant Derek Reese, due to documentation from the future suggesting he was one of Skynet's creators.

In the episode "Samson and Delilah" it is shown that a T-1001 infiltration unit was sent from the future to head the technological corporation ZeiraCorp as its CEO, Catherine Weaver. Weaver acquired the Turk after Goode's death and used the company's resources to further develop it under the title Babylon. The episode "The Mousetrap" revealed that it is also targeting its fellow cyborgs, including a T-888 known as Cromartie.

In the episode "The Tower is Tall but the Fall is Short", Turk has begun to display traits of intelligence. A child psychologist, Dr. Boyd Sherman, notes that the computer is beginning to behave like "a gifted child that has become bored". The Turk identifies itself as John Henry, a name it acquired while working with Dr. Boyd Sherman.

In the episode "Strange Things Happen at the One Two Point", Turk is installed by ZeiraCorp in Cromartie's body after Cromartie's chip was destroyed by the series' protagonists in "Mr. Ferguson is ill Today".

In "To the Lighthouse", John Henry reveals that there is another AI. It calls him "brother" and says it wants to survive. By the season finale, it is revealed that the Turk was a red herring, while Skynet is operating as a roving worm on home computers as in Terminator 3, and the Turk has been developed into a benevolent rival AI which Catherine Weaver hoped would be able to defeat Skynet. Her exact motive against Skynet is unknown. John Henry's "brother" is apparently behind the company Kaliba, which is responsible for constructing the Hunter-Killer prototype. This AI (presumably the true precursor to Skynet) also refers to John Henry as its "brother" at one point.

In the episode "Gnothi Seauton", it was revealed that Skynet also sends its Terminators through various points in time not only to go after the Connors and other future Resistance leaders, but also to ensure the future will unfold by eliminating John Connor's own agents who were also sent to the past to interfere with its birth, ensure Skynet's creators will complete its construction, and other specific missions.

Video games
In T2: The Arcade Game, Skynet is a single physical computer which the player destroys before going back in time to save John Connor.

In The Terminator 2029, Skynet is housed within an artificial satellite in orbit around Earth. It is destroyed by the Resistance with a missile.

In The Terminator: Dawn of Fate, the Resistance invades Cheyenne Mountain in order to destroy Skynet's Central Processor. Kyle Reese is instrumental in destroying the primary processor core despite heavy opposition from attacking Skynet units. Before its destruction, Skynet is able to contact an orbiting satellite and activates a fail-safe which restores Skynet at a new location.

The video game Terminator 3: The Redemption, as well as presenting a variation on Rise of the Machines, also features an alternate timeline where John Connor was killed prior to Judgment Day, with the T-850 of the film being sent into this future during its fight with the T-X, requiring it to fight its way back to the temporal displacement engine of the new timeline so that it can go back and save John and Kate.

In the 2019 video game Tom Clancy's Ghost Recon Breakpoint, a live event to promote Terminator: Dark Fate features T-800s as in-game enemies. In the event, Skynet sent T-800s back in time to kill main protagonist Nomad and ally Rasa Aldwin to prevent the Resistance from forming.

Cultural impact

In popular media, Skynet is often used as an analogy for the possible threat that a sufficiently advanced AI could pose to humanity.

See also
 AI takeover
 Colossus: The Forbin Project
 "Dead Hand" is the nickname of a computer system (operational since 1985) that could automatically issue launch orders to Soviet ICBMs if top Soviet military commanders were annihilated in a preemptive nuclear strike.
 List of fictional computers
 HAL 9000
 Technological singularity
 Power Rangers RPM (this Power Ranger season/series follows a similar plot to the Terminator universe with a Computer Virus named Venjix gaining artificial intelligence and plotting humanity's demise)
 Borg
 Cyberman
 SKYNET (surveillance program)
 Cybernetics

Notes

References

External link
 

Terminator (franchise) characters
Existential risk from artificial general intelligence
Fictional androids
Fictional artificial intelligences
Fictional computer viruses
Fictional computers
Fictional dictators
Fictional elements introduced in 1984
Fictional genocide perpetrators
Fictional mass murderers
Time travelers
Video game bosses
Unseen characters
Film supervillains
Robot supervillains